The 2020 European Beach Volleyball Championship is a 2020 edition of European Beach Volleyball Championship which is a unisex competition of national teams which took place from 15 to 20 September 2020 in Jūrmala in Latvia. The draw consisted of 32 men's & 32 women's teams, with  100,000 EUR prize money per gender.

Medal events

Medal table

Medal summary

Men's tournament

Preliminary round

Pool A

|}

|}

Pool B

|}

|}

Pool C

|}

|}

Pool D

|}

|}

Pool E

|}

|}

Pool F

|}

|}

Pool G

|}

|}

Pool H

|}

|}

Knockout stage
A draw will be held to determine the pairings.

Round of 24

|}

Round of 16

|}

Quarterfinals

|}

Semifinals

|}

Third place game

|}

Final

|}

Women's tournament

Preliminary round

Pool A

|}

|}

Pool B

|}

|}

Pool C

|}

|}

Pool D

|}

|}

Pool E

|}

|}

Pool F

|}

|}

Pool G

|}

|}

Pool H

|}

|}

Knockout stage
A draw will be held to determine the pairings.

Round of 24

|}

Round of 16

|}

Quarterfinals

|}

Semifinals

|}

Third place game

|}

Final

|}

References

External links
Men's tournament – Results
Women's tournament – Results

European Beach Volleyball Championships
European Beach Volleyball
European Beach Volleyball
European Beach Volleyball Championships
International volleyball competitions hosted by Latvia